The field hockey tournament at the 1932 Summer Olympics was the fourth edition of the field hockey event at the Summer Olympic Games.

Medal summary

Results

Standings

Matches

References

External links
Men Field Hockey Olympic Games 1932 Los Angeles (USA)
Field Hockey Men: Olympic Games 1932 at Los Angeles (usa)

 
Field hockey at the Summer Olympics
1932 Summer Olympics events
1932
1932 in field hockey